Gray Whale Cove State Beach is a California State Park between Pacifica, California, and Montara, California, by Highway 1 and approximately 18 miles south of San Francisco. It features a sheltered cove surrounded by abrupt cliffs, with trails connecting to nearby Montara Mountain and McNee Ranch State Park.  It is located just south of Devil's Slide.  The  park was established in 1966.

Montara State Marine Reserve & Pillar Point State Marine Conservation Area extend offshore from Montara, just south of Gray Whale Cove.  Like underwater parks, these marine protected areas help conserve ocean wildlife and marine ecosystems.

See also
List of beaches in California
List of California state parks

References

External links 
Gray Whale Cove State Beach

1966 establishments in California
California State Beaches
Parks in San Mateo County, California
Protected areas established in 1966
San Francisco Bay Area beaches
Beaches of San Mateo County, California
Beaches of Northern California